The following outline is provided as an overview of and topical guide to the Book of Mormon:

The Book of Mormon is a sacred text of the Latter Day Saint movement, which adherents believe contains writings of ancient prophets who lived on the American continent from approximately 2200 BC to AD 421. It was first published in March 1830 by Joseph Smith as The Book of Mormon: An Account Written by the Hand of Mormon upon Plates Taken from the Plates of Nephi.

What type of thing is the Book of Mormon? 
The Book of Mormon can be described as all of the following:

 Scripture –
 Revelation (Latter Day Saints) –
 Standard works –
Latter Day Saint movement and engraved metal plates –
Literature –
Book –

Books of the Book of Mormon 
Small Plates of Nephi
First Book of Nephi
Second Book of Nephi
Book of Jacob
Book of Enos
Book of Jarom
Book of Omni
Words of Mormon
Mormon's abridgment of  the Large Plates of Nephi
Book of Mosiah
Book of Alma
Book of Helaman
Third Nephi
Fourth Nephi
Book of Mormon
Book of Ether
Book of Moroni

Historicity of Book of Mormon 
Historicity of the Book of Mormon
Archaeology and the Book of Mormon
Linguistics and the Book of Mormon
Book of Mormon anachronisms
Genetics and the Book of Mormon
Limited geography model
Proposed Book of Mormon geographical setting

Origin of Book of Mormon 
Origin of the Book of Mormon
Golden plates
Book of Mormon witnesses
Three Witnesses
Eight Witnesses
Angel Moroni
Anthon Transcript
Reformed Egyptian
Spalding–Rigdon theory of Book of Mormon authorship
The Book of Mormon and the King James Bible
View of the Hebrews
Lost 116 pages
Mosiah priority

Book of Mormon witnesses 
Main article
Book of Mormon witnesses
Three Witnesses
Three Witnesses
Oliver Cowdery
Martin Harris (Latter Day Saints)
David Whitmer
Church of Christ (Whitmerite)
Eight Witnesses
Eight Witnesses
Christian Whitmer
Jacob Whitmer
Peter Whitmer Jr.
John Whitmer
Hiram Page
Joseph Smith Sr.
Hyrum Smith
Samuel H. Smith (Latter Day Saints)
Another Witness
Mary Whitmer

Prophets and People

Prophets
List of Book of Mormon prophets
 Lehi
 Nephi
 Jacob
 Enos
 Jarom
 Omni
 Amaron
 Chemish
 Abinadom
 Amaleki
 King Benjamin
 Mosiah
 Abinadi
 Alma the Elder
 Alma the Younger
 Sons of Mosiah 
 Omner
 Himni
 Amulek
 Zeezrom 
 Helaman
 Shiblon
 Helaman II
 Nephi
 Lehi
 Samuel the Lamanite
 Nephi
 Timothy
 Nephi, son of Nephi the Disciple
 Mathoni
 Mathonihah
 Kumen
 Kumenonhi
 Shemnon
 Amos
 Amos II
 Ammaron
 Mormon
 Moroni
 Brother of Jared
 Ether

People
List of Book of Mormon people
Aaron (Lamanite)
Aaron (Nephite)
Abinadom
Abish (Book of Mormon)
Aha (Book of Mormon)
Akish
Amaleki
Amaleki (Book of Mormon explorer)
Amalickiah
Amaron
Aminadab
Aminadi
Amlici
Ammah (Book of Mormon)
Ammaron
Ammon (Book of Mormon explorer)
Ammon (Book of Mormon missionary)
Ammoron
Amoron
Amos, son of Amos
Amos, son of Nephi
Amulek
Amulon
Antiomno
Antionah
Antionum
Antipus
Cezoram
Chemish
Gazelem
Gid (Book of Mormon)
Gideon (Book of Mormon)
Hagoth
Helaman, son of Helaman
Himni
Ishmael (Book of Mormon)
Jared (founder of Jaredites)
Joseph (Book of Mormon)
King Mosiah I
King Mosiah II
King Noah
Korihor
Laban (Book of Mormon)
Lachoneus
Laman and Lemuel
Lamoni
Limhi
Moron (Book of Mormon)
Captain Moroni
Moronihah
Mulek
Nehor
Omner
Omni (Book of Mormon record keeper)
Paanchi (Book of Mormon)
Pahoran
Sam (Book of Mormon)
Sariah
Shiblon
Shiz
Sons of Mosiah
Teancum
Zedekiah
Zeezrom
Zeniff
Zenos
Zeram, Amnor, Manti, and Limher
Zoram
Book of Mormon rulers
Jaredite kings

Groups
List of Book of Mormon groups
Amlicites
Amalekites
Amulonites
Anti-Nephi-Lehies, or People of Ammon
Gadianton robbers
Gentile
Hagoth, People of
Ishmaelites
Jaredites
King-men
Lamanites
Lemuelites
Mulekites
Nephites
Order of the Nehors
Stripling Warriors'Zarahemla
Zeniff, People of
Zoramites

Places

List of Book of Mormon places
City of Aaron
Ablom
Plains of Agosh
Wilderness of Akish
Valley of Alma
City of Ammonihah
Hill Amnihu
Land of Amulon
Angola
Ani-Anti
Land of Antionum
Antiparah
Mount Antipas
Boaz
City of Bountiful (Book of Mormon)
Hill Comnor
City of Cumeni
Cumorah
Desolation
Land of first inheritance
Lehi-Nephi
Valley of Lemuel
Waters of Mormon
Land of Moron
Nahom
Narrow neck of land
Narrow strip of wilderness
City of Nephi
Land northward
Hill Shim
River Sidon
Land Southward
Zarahemla

 Book of Mormon words and phrases 

Curelom and cumom
Deseret (Book of Mormon)
God Loveth His Children
Great and abominable church
Liahona (Book of Mormon)
Parable of the Olive Tree
Rameumptom
Record of the Nephites
Secret combination (Latter Day Saints)
Three Nephites
Tree of life vision
Ziff (Book of Mormon)

 Plan of salvation (Latter Day Saints)
 Spirit world (Latter Day Saints)

 Book of Mormon artifacts 
The Joseph Smith Papers
Latter Day Saint movement and engraved metal plates
List of plates in Mormonism
List of references to seer stones in the Latter Day Saint movement history
Lost 116 pages
Urim and Thummim (Latter Day Saints)

 Organizations that study the Book of Mormon 

Foundation for Ancient Research and Mormon Studies
FAIR (Faithful Answers, Informed Response)
Interpreter Foundation
John Whitmer Historical Association
Neal A. Maxwell Institute for Religious Scholarship
Religious Studies Center

 Publications about the Book of Mormon Dialogue: A Journal of Mormon ThoughtInternational Journal of Mormon StudiesInterpreter: A Journal of Latter-day Saint Faith and ScholarshipJournal of Book of Mormon StudiesMormon Studies Review (journal)Studies of the Book of Mormon (book of essays)
Sunstone (magazine)

 Book of Mormon scholars 
Paul R. Cheesman
Terryl Givens
Grant Hardy
Brent Metcalfe
Hugh Nibley
Daniel C. Peterson
B. H. Roberts
Janne M. Sjödahl
Royal Skousen
John L. Sorenson
Sidney B. Sperry
Dan Vogel

 Films about the Book of Mormon 
LDS Church filmsHow Rare a Possession''
Book of Mormon Videos
LDS cinema
The Book of Mormon Movie, Vol. 1: The Journey 
Passage to Zarahemla

List of denominations in the Latter Day Saint movement 
Main article
List of denominations in the Latter Day Saint movement
Original church within movement
Church of Christ
Churches that separated from Smith's organization prior to 1844
Pure Church of Christ
True Church of Jesus Christ of Latter Day Saints
Lineage of Brigham Young
The Church of Jesus Christ of Latter-day Saints
LDS-derived churches upholding polygamy after the Manifesto of 1890
Council of Friends
Latter Day Church of Christ (Kingston Group)
Apostolic United Brethren (AUB)
Fundamentalist Church of Jesus Christ of Latter-Day Saints (FLDS)
Church of the Firstborn of the Fulness of Times (LeBaron order)
Church of Jesus Christ in Solemn Assembly
Church of the First Born of the Lamb of God (Ervil LeBaron)
Church of the New Covenant in Christ
Righteous Branch of the Church of Jesus Christ of Latter-day Saints (Peterson Group)
School of the Prophets
Centennial Park
The Church of Jesus Christ of Latter-day Saints and the Kingdom of God (Naylor group)
True and Living Church of Jesus Christ of Saints of the Last Days (TLC)
The Church of the Firstborn and the General Assembly of Heaven
Church of Jesus Christ (Original Doctrine) Inc. (Blackmore Group)
Left-of-center LDS-derived churches
The Church of Zion (Godbeites)
United Order Family of Christ
Restoration Church of Jesus Christ
Additional churches claiming lineage through Brigham Young and/or founded in the U.S. Intermountain West
Church of the Potter Christ
Church of the Firstborn (Morrisite)
Church of Jesus Christ of Latter Day Saints (Gibsonite)
Kingdom of Heaven
Church of Jesus Christ of Saints of the Most High
Order of Enoch
Third Convention
House of Aaron
Zion's Order, Inc.
Perfected Church of Jesus Christ of Immaculate Latter-day Saints
Church of Jesus Christ (Bullaite)
Latter Day Church of Jesus Christ
Reorganized Church and other followers of Joseph Smith III ("Josephites")
Community of Christ (formerly the RLDS)
Church of the Christian Brotherhood
Church of Jesus Christ Restored
Church of Jesus Christ (Toneyite)
Independent RLDS / Restoration Branches
Church of Jesus Christ Restored 1830
Church of Christ
Church of Jesus Christ (Zion's Branch)
Lundgren Group
Restoration Church of Jesus Christ of Latter Day Saints
Remnant Church of Jesus Christ of Latter Day Saints
Followers of Granville Hedrick ("Hedrickites")
Church of Christ (Temple Lot)
Church of Christ (Fettingite)
Church of Christ at Halley's Bluff
Church of Christ (Restored)
Church of Christ With the Elijah Message
Church of Christ (Hancock)
Church of Christ
Church of Israel
The Church of Christ With the Elijah Message, The Assured Way of the Lord, Inc.
Followers of Sidney Rigdon or William Bickerton ("Bickertonites")
Church of Jesus Christ of the Children of Zion
The Church of Jesus Christ (Bickertonite)
Reorganized Church of Jesus Christ (Bickertonite)
Primitive Church of Jesus Christ (Bickertonite)
Followers of Alpheus Cutler ("Cutlerites")
Church of Jesus Christ (Cutlerite)
True Church of Jesus Christ (Cutlerite)
Restored Church of Jesus Christ
Followers of James J. Strang ("Strangites")
Church of Jesus Christ of Latter Day Saints (Strangite)
Holy Church of Jesus Christ
Church of Jesus Christ (Drewite)
True Church of Jesus Christ Restored
Spontaneous or unknown lineage
Independent Latter Day Saint congregations in Nigeria
Independent Latter Day Saint congregations in Ghana
Apostolic Divine Church of Ghana

See also 
Index of articles related to The Church of Jesus Christ of Latter-day Saints
Outline of The Church of Jesus Christ of Latter-day Saints
Outline of Joseph Smith
Reformed Egyptian

References

Further reading

External links

Interactive reading 
 Book of Mormon Online

Historic versions 
Facsimile of the 1830 edition
RLDS 1908 Book of Mormon (RLDS chapters and numbering)
The Book of Mormon; An Account Written By the Hand of Mormon Upon Plates Taken From the Plates of Nephi. From the Collections at the Library of Congress

Videos 

 1
Book of Mormon
Book of Mormon
Book of Mormon studies